Leonard Joseph Whitehouse (born September 10, 1957) is a retired Major League Baseball player who pitched in relief for the Texas Rangers in  and for the Minnesota Twins from  to .

Whitehouse played two seasons of high school baseball at Burlington High School in his native Burlington, Vermont. After attending a tryout for the Pittsburgh Pirates in Maine, he was invited to participate in the Florida Instructional League in 1976. He signed a contract with the Texas Rangers on Christmas afternoon 1976 at Burlington International Airport.

He finished his career with a 9-4 record with four saves and a 4.24 ERA in 97 appearances. Since 1967, Whitehouse is one of only two Vermont high school baseball players to make it into the Major Leagues. He was the pitcher when Reggie Jackson struck out for the 2,000th time in his career.

References

External links

1957 births
Living people
Major League Baseball pitchers
Baseball players from Vermont
Texas Rangers players
Minnesota Twins players
Sportspeople from Burlington, Vermont
Asheville Tourists players
Charleston Charlies players
Denver Bears players
Gulf Coast Rangers players
Glens Falls Tigers players
Toledo Mud Hens players
Tulsa Drillers players
Wichita Aeros players
Burlington High School (Vermont) alumni